When the Meteor Shot Across the Sky is a 2016 Chinese romantic drama film directed by Song Qi and starring Xu Nuo, Sun Lihua, Liang Yu and Yang Xiaorong. It was released in China by Beijing Jinyi Qiankun Entertainment on June 17, 2016.

Plot

Cast
Xu Nuo
Sun Lihua
Liang Yu
Yang Xiaorong

Reception
The film grossed  in China.

References

Chinese romantic drama films
2016 romantic drama films